Canada (AG) v Ward,  [1993] 2 S.C.R. 689 is a leading immigration case decided by the Supreme Court of Canada on test for determining a "well-founded fear of persecution" in order to make a claim for Convention refugee status. The Court held that persecution need not originate from the state, and that mere inability to provide protection is sufficient to establish a claim for persecution.

Background
Patrick Ward was a member of the Irish National Liberation Army. He was assigned to guard some hostages and when they were ordered to be killed he allowed them to escape. The INLA discovered that Ward has assisted in the escape from the police. They tortured him and sentenced him to death. He escaped and went to the police who discovered his involvement in the initial kidnapping so sent him to jail. Upon his release he escaped to Canada and claimed refugee status. His claim was initially rejected and was sent back for redetermination on appeal. The refugee determination board found he was a refugee, on appeal to the Federal Court of Canada the claim was rejected. Ward appealed to the Supreme Court of Canada.

Opinion of the Court
La Forest J., writing for a unanimous Court, held that Ward did not fall into the convention refugee definition.

See also
 List of Supreme Court of Canada cases

External links
 

Canadian immigration and refugee case law
Supreme Court of Canada cases
1993 in Canadian case law
1993 in international relations